Macroglossum napolovi is a moth of the family Sphingidae which is endemic to northern Vietnam.

References

napolovi
Moths described in 2004
Endemic fauna of Vietnam
Moths of Asia